Moeller and Möller are closely related surnames of German origin.

People bearing one of them include the following:

People
 Adolph Moeller, American politician
 Alfred Alphonse Moeller (1889–1971), governor of Orientale Province in the Belgian Congo from 1926 to 1933
 Andreas Möller (born 1967), German footballer
 Andy Moeller, American football coach
 Arthur Moeller van den Bruck
 Birger Moeller-Pedersen
 Brian Moehler, major league baseball player
 Chad Moeller, major league baseball player
 Charles Moeller (historian)
 Christian Moeller
 Christopher Moeller
 Dennis Moeller, major league baseball player
 Edmund Moeller (disambiguation), multiple people
 Emil Moeller
 Gary Moeller (1941–2022), American football coach
 Gustave Moeller, American painter
 Henry K. Moeller
 Jacques-Nicolas Moeller, philosopher
 James Moeller
 Jean Moeller, Belgian historian
 Jim Moeller
 Joe Moeller, major league baseball player
 Johnny Moeller
 Jorgen Moeller, Danish chess player
 Louis Moeller, American genre painter
 Robert T. Moeller
 Ron Moeller, major league baseball player
 Sanford A. Moeller, Moeller drum method author
 Walter H. Moeller

See also
Moller, surname

Notes

Germanic-language surnames
Low German surnames
Occupational surnames